The 1985 European Athletics Junior Championships was the eighth edition of the biennial athletics competition for European athletes aged under twenty. It was held in Cottbus, East Germany between 22 and 25 August.

Men's results

Women's results

Medal table

References

Results
European Junior Championships 1985. World Junior Athletics History. Retrieved on 2013-05-27.

European Athletics U20 Championships
International athletics competitions hosted by East Germany
European Junior
Sport in Cottbus
1985 in youth sport
1985 in East German sport
20th century in Cottbus